Till We Have Faces is the sixth album by saxophonist Gary Thomas which was recorded in 1992 and released on the JMT label. As with his previous album While the Gate Is Open (1990), it features Thomas' interpretations of eight jazz standards.

Reception

The AllMusic review by Thom Jurek states, "This is Thomas' best moment on record thus far, and a casebook example of reinterpreting the jazz genre." The Chicago Tribune's Jack Fuller noted "The combination of Gary Thomas' whirling dervish tenor saxophone and Pat Metheny's guitar makes this an outstanding recording".

Track listing

Personnel
Gary Thomas – tenor saxophone, soprano saxophone, flute
Pat Metheny – electric guitar (tracks 1-6 & 8)
Tim Murphy – piano  (tracks 1, 4, 6 & 8)
Anthony Cox – bass (tracks 1, 5 & 6), Ed Howard (tracks 2, 4, 7 & 8) 
Terri Lyne Carrington – drums (tracks 1, 2 & 4-8)
Steve Moss – percussion (track 6)

References 

1992 albums
Gary Thomas (musician) albums
JMT Records albums
Winter & Winter Records albums